William Thomas Ellis (July 24, 1845 – January 8, 1925) was a U.S. Representative from Kentucky, United States.

Early life and family
William Ellis was born near Knottsville, Kentucky, on July 24, 1845. He was one of two sons born Luther R. and Mary M. (Kellum) Ellis.

Ellis was educated in the common schools until age sixteen. On October 5, 1861, he enlisted as a private in the First Kentucky Confederate Cavalry. This unit became a part of the Orphan Brigade. Ellis eventually rose to become a non-commissioned officer in command of scouts. He served until the end of the war and mustered out on April 21, 1865.

After the war, Ellis resumed his studies at Pleasant Valley Cemetery in Daviess County. To defray the cost of his education, he worked during the summer months. He studied law, supporting himself by serving as principal of Mount Etna Academy in Ohio County in 1867 and 1868. Admitted to the bar in 1868, he attended a course of lectures at Harvard Law School before commencing practice in Owensboro in 1870.

On October 20, 1871, Ellis married Alice Coffey. Coffey died in 1872, and on November 2, 1876, Ellis married Mattie B. Miller.

Political career
In August 1870, Ellis was elected county attorney for Daviess County. He was re-elected to this position in 1874. He served as a Democratic presidential elector for the ticket of Samuel J. Tilden and Thomas Andrews Hendricks in the 1876 presidential election. He unsuccessfully sought election to the Fiftieth Congress in 1886.

Ellis was elected to represent Kentucky's Second District in the U.S. House of Representatives in 1888. He was twice re-elected, serving in the Fifty-first, Fifty-second, and Fifty-third Congresses (March 4, 1889 – March 3, 1895). While he was away from his law practice on congressional business, the firm's business was handled by his law partners, one of whom was future Congressman William N. Sweeney.

During the Fifty-second and Fifty-third Congresses, he chaired the Committee on Revision of the Laws. A Free Silver supporter, he served on the Banking and Currency Committee and was critical of President Grover Cleveland's sound money position. He did not seek re-election in 1894.

Later life and death
After his service in Congress, Ellis returned to his law practice. He was a delegate to the 1896 Democratic National Convention. He also engaged in literary pursuits.

Ellis died in Owensboro, Kentucky, on January 8, 1925, and was interred in Rosehill Elmwood Cemetery.

References

Bibliography

External links

1845 births
1925 deaths
Confederate States Army soldiers
Harvard Law School alumni
Kentucky lawyers
Orphan Brigade
People from Daviess County, Kentucky
Democratic Party members of the United States House of Representatives from Kentucky
19th-century American lawyers